The Gandhidham - Nagercoil Weekly Express is an express train belonging to Southern Railway Zone that runs between  and  in India. It runs through Konkan Railway route of west coast of India. It runs only in Friday from Gandhidham Junction to Nagercoil Junction & it runs Tuesday from Nagercoil Junction to Gandhidham Junction in India.  

Coach Composition

The train has standard ICF rakes with max speed of 110 kmph. The train consists of 23 coaches:

 1 AC II Tier
 5 AC III Tier
 10 Sleeper III Tier
 1 Pantry Car
 4 General Unreserved
 2 Seating cum Luggage Rake

As is customary with most train services in India, coach composition may be amended at the discretion of Indian Railways depending on demand.

Service

Routing

,
,

Schedule

Traction

See also
Netravati Express
Ernakulam-Okha Express

References

External links
16335/Gandhidham - Nagercoil Express at India Rail Info
16336/Nagercoil - Gandhidham Express at India Rail Info

Express trains in India
Transport in Gandhidham
Rail transport in Gujarat
Rail transport in Maharashtra
Rail transport in Goa
Rail transport in Karnataka
Rail transport in Kerala
Rail transport in Tamil Nadu
Transport in Nagercoil
Railway services introduced in 1992
Konkan Railway